Nagarahavu (English: Cobra) is a 2016 Indian Kannada language epic fantasy film directed by Kodi Ramakrishna, the final film directed by him before his death in 2019, and produced by Sajid Qureshi, Inbox Pictures Pvt Ltd.

With Ramya in the lead role, a digitally recreated CGI version of deceased actor Vishnuvardhan has played the main role, with the film being marketed as his "comeback". Actors Diganth, Saikumar, Rajesh Vivek, and Sadhu Kokila play supporting roles.

The music was composed by Gurukiran with cinematography by H. C. Venugopal and editing by Jhony Harsha. The film has been dubbed and released in Tamil as Shivanagam, Telugu as Nagabharanam, and Hindi as Nagavanshi. The film released on 14 October 2016.

The film was a festive season to fans for having come back of legendary actor Vishnuvardhan through CGI effect.

Plot 
Nagarahavu is about a woman transforming into a snake to seek revenge.

The story revolves around an ancient kalasha (divine vessel), a Lord Shiva Monument. On the Soorya Grahan (solar eclipse) day, it collects the strength of the gods and goddesses. A series of attempts have been made by the demons to capture it, but fail in possessing it.

The story then shifts to present, Nagacharan (Diganth), a talented singer and musician along with his friends wants to win a National Music Competition. It is shown that the kalasha is excavated by the archeologists and becomes the trophy in the music competition. The kalasha is the most wanted thing for baddies led by Mukul Dev, Amit Tiwari, and Ravi Kale. They send a music troop to win the competition. A girl named Manasa (Ramya) get close to Nagacharan with the pretext of learning music. Her motives and calculations are different.

Mukul Dev threatens Nagacharan to quit the competition because Nagacharan is the only opposition they have to win the music competition and he refuses to quit. Mukul Dev kills his friends in an accident. In retaliation, Manasa kills Amit Tiwari and Ravi Kale revealing her as an icchadhaari serpent. Nagacharan witness it and question her identity.

Then, Manasa explains her past that in her previous birth she is Naganika (Ramya), daughter of Shivaiyya (Saikumar) who and his forefathers have been saving an ancient Lord Shiva monument since hundreds of years ago. The evil Tantrik, Kapali (Rajesh Vivek), and his forefathers have been fighting with Naganika's family for many years to occupy the Lord Shiva monument. Kapali kills Naganika in a battle to occupy the Lord Shiva monument. A dying Naganika then takes an oath that she will come back to take revenge on Kapali. In the next birth, Naganika takes birth as Manasa, a snake woman to get back the kalasha and protect it.

Nagacharan promise her that he will win the kalasha at any cost. Mukul Dev and Kapali team up and capture Manasa. In the end, she gets help from Lord Shiva himself, who sends his serpent necklace, King Nagaraja (Vishnuvardhan) is a mythical king who comes to her rescue. He releases Manasa from her captivity and they both kills Mukul Dev and Kapali. Nagacharan wins the competition and the pair places the kalasha before the Shiva idol.

Cast
 Ramya as Manasa and Naganika
 Vishnuvardhan as King Nagaraja (created with CGI)
 Diganth as Nagacharan
 Saikumar as Shivaiyya
 Rajesh Vivek as Kapali
 Sadhu Kokila as Sadha
 Mukul Dev as Baddie
 Amit Tiwari as Baddie
 Ravi Kale as Baddie
 Rangayana Raghu
 Darshan in a cameo appearance in Nagarahavu Title Song

Production
The film has no relation to the 1972 film of the same name which also starred Vishnuvardhan. It began production in 2013 and was shot in 149 days at Kantirava studio, Lalita Mahal, Mysuru and Ramoji Studios. The visual effects are given by Makuta VFX with over hundred of artists working for the visual effects. Dr. Vishnuvardhan was created through CGI. It nearly took two years to create, and the work was distributed in six countries. Super star Darshan appeared in a cameo for a song which was a tribute to Vishnuvardhan.

Soundtrack

Gurukiran was signed to compose the soundtrack album and background score for the film. The audio was released on 14 August 2016 at a government hospital in Bangalore. A charity event was also planned coinciding the audio launch to the downtrodden hospitalized patients. Initially, it was announced that actress Anushka Shetty would launch the album officially. However, it turned out to be a rumor.

Release
An official teaser for the film was released on 30 May 2016. It became the fastest teaser for a Kannada film to reach 1,000,000 views on YouTube. Film released on 14th Oct 2016 in Kannada, Telugu and Tamil at nearly

References

External links
 

2016 films
2010s historical fantasy films
2010s Kannada-language films
Films about reincarnation
Films about shapeshifting
Films directed by Kodi Ramakrishna
Films scored by Gurukiran
Indian epic films
Indian historical fantasy films
Films using motion capture
Films about snakes